XHEVP-FM is a radio station on 95.3 FM in Acapulco, Guerrero. It is owned by Grupo Audiorama Comunicaciones and carries its La Bestia Grupera grupera format.

History
XEVP-AM 1030 received its concession on March 4, 1987. It was owned by Radiorama subsidiary Radio Universo, S.A., and it broadcast as a daytimer with 1 kW. In 1993, it was allowed to begin nighttime broadcasts with 500 watts.

In November 2010, XEVP was cleared to move to FM as XHEVP-FM 95.3.

References

Radio stations in Guerrero
Radio stations established in 1987